This is a list of all captains of the Carlton Football Club, an Australian rules football club in the Australian Football League and AFL Women's.

VFL/AFL

AFL Women's

References

Carlton Football Club Honour Board

Carlton
Captains
Melbourne sport-related lists